Róbert Cicman (born 3 September 1984) is a professional Slovak football centre back who plays for FK Čaňa..

Career statistics

Honours

MFK Košice
 Slovak Cup (1): 2008–09

External links
 
 MFK Košice profile
 Gambrinus liga statistics at idnes.cz

Living people
1984 births
Sportspeople from Košice
Association football central defenders
Slovak footballers
FC VSS Košice players
FC Steel Trans Ličartovce players
SK Slavia Prague players
FC Nitra players
Sandecja Nowy Sącz players
FK Haniska players
FC Lokomotíva Košice players
FK Slavoj Trebišov players
Slovak Super Liga players
Czech First League players
Slovak expatriate footballers
Expatriate footballers in the Czech Republic
Expatriate footballers in Poland
Slovak expatriate sportspeople in the Czech Republic
2. Liga (Slovakia) players